Binghamton is an unincorporated community in the Town of Black Creek in Outagamie County, Wisconsin, United States.

Geography
Binghamton is located at (44.426944, -88.473889). Its elevation is 830 feet (252.9m).

Transportation

Local events
Polkafest (Held at Romy's Nitingale)

References

External links
 Hometown Locator-Binghamton

Unincorporated communities in Outagamie County, Wisconsin
Unincorporated communities in Wisconsin